NU'EST is a five-member South Korean boy group composed of JR, Aron, Baekho, Minhyun and Ren. Despite the group's strong debut in 2012, their fame was not sustained in the succeeding years, prompting four of the members to join the reality survival show Produce 101 Season 2 in 2017. After the show, the group saw an incredible surge in popularity, which earned them the title of "Reversal Icons". While Minhyun was promoting in Wanna One, the rest of the members promoted as NU'EST W. As NU'EST W, the group attended and won in their first-ever year-end award ceremony since debut. In an interview, they shared that it already felt like a dream just to be invited to attend the ceremony so they did not even expect to win anything. The group has since then consistently secured multiple awards and nominations from various award-giving bodies throughout their promotions as NU'EST W and continued with their reunion as five members in 2019.

Awards and nominations

Notes

References 

Awards
Nuest